Fu Jen Catholic University Hospital (FJCUH) is a hospital in Taishan District, New Taipei, Taiwan that was founded in 2017.

The hospital takes "Taiwan's Mayo Clinic" as its development target.。

History 
1990: The College of Medicine of Fu Jen Catholic University (輔大醫學院) was established.
2007: The University Clinic (輔大診所) was opened at Fu Jen's College of Medicine.
2017: The University Hospital (輔大醫院) was established.
2021: Due to its outstanding performance in coping with the COVID-19 pandemic, The University Hospital was rated as one of the "top ten future hospitals in the world" by British media Healthcare.

Transportation 
The hospital is accessible within walking distance north from Fu Jen Catholic University's Guizi Gate.

See also 
 List of hospitals in Taiwan
 Fu Jen Catholic University

References

2017 establishments in Taiwan
Teaching hospitals in Taiwan
Hospitals established in 2017
Buildings and structures in New Taipei
Catholic hospitals in Asia
Fu Jen Catholic University